Bhutan sent a delegation to compete at the 2000 Summer Olympics in Sydney, Australia from 15 September to 1 October 2000.  This was the Kingdom's fifth appearance at a Summer Olympic Games. The delegation to Sydney consisted of two archers, Jubzhang Jubzhang and Tshering Chhoden. Both Jubzhang and Choden did not advance past the round of 64 in their respective matches.

Background
The Bhutan Olympic Committee was recognized by the International Olympic Committee on 31 December 1982.  The Kingdom first participated in the Summer Olympic Games at the 1984 Summer Olympics, and have taken part in every Summer Olympics since then, making Sydney their fifth appearance in a Summer Olympiad.  They have never participated in a Winter Olympic Games.  The 2000 Summer Olympics were held from 15 September to 1 October 2000; 10,651 athletes represented 199 National Olympic Committees. The Bhutanese delegation to Sydney consisted of two archers, Jubzhang Jubzhang and Tshering Chhodenn. Jubzhang was chosen as the flag bearer for the opening ceremony.

Archery

Jubzhang was 29 years old at the time of the Sydney Olympics, and had previously represented Bhutan — at the 1996 and the 1992 Olympics. In the ranking round of the men's individual competition held on 16 September, he scored 596 points and earned himself the 55th seed. In the first round of the knockout phase, he lost 162–156 to Nico Hendrickx of Belgium.

Chhoden was 21 years old at the time and was making her Olympic debut. In the ranking round of the women's individual, also held on 16 September, she scored 614 points and slotted herself into the 50th seed. In the first knockout round, she lost, 165–153, to Hamdiah Damanhuri of Indonesia.

References

Nations at the 2000 Summer Olympics
2000
Olympics